Holy Saturday, also known as Great and Holy Saturday (also Holy and Great Saturday), the Great Sabbath, Hallelujah Saturday (in Portugal and Brazil), Saturday of the Glory, Sabado de Gloria, and Black Saturday or Easter Eve, and called "Joyous Saturday", "the Saturday of Light", and "Mega Sabbatun" among Coptic Christians, is the final day of Holy Week, between Good Friday and Easter Sunday, when Christians prepare for the latter. The day commemorates the Harrowing of Hell while Jesus Christ's body lay in the tomb. Christians of the Catholic, Lutheran, Methodist, Anglican and Reformed denominations begin the celebration of the Easter Vigil service on Holy Saturday, which provides a transition to the season of Eastertide; in the Moravian Christian tradition, graves are decorated with flowers during the day of Holy Saturday and the celebration of the sunrise service starts before dawn on Easter Sunday.

Terminology

Jewish Nazarenes

In Hebrews 4, Jewish Christians are admonished to make every effort to enter this sabbath and every sabbath in repentance, and psalm 95 is excerpted by the author of Hebrews: "today if you hear his voice, do not harden your hearts." The entire Psalm 95 is read on Friday afternoon every week in synagogue prayers immediately before receiving the sabbath in rabbinic Judaism.

Eastern traditions
Eastern Orthodoxy

In Eastern Orthodoxy this day, known as Holy and Great Saturday, is also called The Great Sabbath since it is on this day that Christ "rested" physically in the tomb. But it is also believed that it was on this day he performed in spirit the Harrowing of Hell and raised up to Paradise, having liberated those who had been held captive.

Oriental Orthodoxy

In the Coptic, Ethiopian and Eritrean Orthodox Churches, this day is known as Joyous Saturday, otherwise known as the night of light and joy. It is known as the Saturday of Good Tidings or Gospel Saturday in the Syriac Church, which is also a day where Syriac Christians remember their departed.

Western traditions

In Western traditions, the day is usually called Holy Saturday, although in the Moravian Church, the day is referred to as the Great Sabbath and in the Anglican Communion, the Book of Common Prayer refers to the day as Easter Even. Although the term Easter Saturday is usually applied to the Saturday in Easter week, in English-speaking countries it is sometimes applied to Holy Saturday, including in legislation in the Australian states of New South Wales and Queensland, and by Australian government agencies. In the Catholic tradition, the Blessed Virgin Mary is honored on this day under the title Our Lady of Solitude, referring to her grief at the death of her son.

Religious and cultural practices

Eastern traditions

Eastern Orthodox

Matins of Holy and Great Saturday (in parishes usually held on Friday evening) takes the form of a funeral service for Christ. The entire service takes place around the Epitaphios, an icon in the form of a cloth embroidered with the image of Christ prepared for burial. The first part of the service consists of chanting Psalm 118, as usual at both Saturday matins and at funerals, but interspersed with hymns (enkomia or lamentations) between the verses. The predominant theme of the service is not so much one of mourning, but of watchful expectation:

Today Thou dost keep holy the seventh day, Which Thou has blessed of old by resting from Thy works. Thou bringest all things into being and Thou makest all things new, Observing the Sabbath rest, my Saviour, and restoring strength.

Near the end of matins, at the end of the Great Doxology, the Epitaphios is taken up and carried in procession around the outside of the church, while the Trisagion is sung, as is done when carrying the body to the cemetery in an Orthodox burial.

On Saturday, a vesperal Divine Liturgy of Saint Basil the Great is celebrated, called the First Resurrection Service, named so because chronologically it was composed earlier than the Paschal Canon by St. John of Damascus rather than because it occurs earlier liturgically. This is the longest Divine Liturgy of the entire year and is performed later than on any other day of the year, "at the tenth hour of the day". On 'Lord, I call', four of the usual Sunday hymns from the Octoechos are sung, followed by four for the day, the doxasticon from Lauds the night before and the usual dogmatikon. After the Little Entrance, there is no Evening Prokimenon, but there are 15 Old Testament readings that recall the history of salvation, many of which relate to Passover, baptism, or the Resurrection (note that book names here are given according to the Septuagint):

 Genesis 1:1-13 – God creates the universe
 Isaiah 60:1-16 – Isaiah prophecies a golden age for Judah
 Exodus 12:1-11 – God gives instructions for the first Passover
 Jonah 1:1-4:11 – Jonah spends three days in the belly of a sea monster
 Joshua 5:10-15 – Joshua celebrates Passover
 Exodus 13:20-15:19 – The Israelites cross the Red Sea (note that the final 19 verses are sung as a canticle)
 Zephaniah 3:8-15 – God promises refuge to Israel
 3 Kings 17:8-24 – Elijah meets the widow of Zarephath and resurrects her son
 Isaiah 61:10-62:5 – Isaiah celebrates a coming salvation
 Genesis 22:1-18 – God tests Abraham by telling him to sacrifice his son Isaac
 Isaiah 61:1-9 – Isaiah explains the role of a prophet and the relationship Israel will have with God
 4 Kings 4:8-37 – Elisha resurrects the son of the Shunamite woman
 Isaiah 63:11-64:5 – Isaiah remembers the crossing of the Red Sea and prays for his people
 Jeremiah 31:31-34 – Jeremiah prophecies the new covenant
 Daniel 3:1-89 – The Three Holy Youths are cast into a fiery furnace (note that the final 33 verses (and three extra-biblical ones) are sung as a canticle)

In place of the Trisagion, the baptismal hymn 'As many as have been baptised into Christ have put on Christ. Alleluia.' is sung. The Prokimenon is from Psalm 65 (66), made up of verses from the First Antiphon of Pascha: 'Let all the earth worship Thee: sing of Thee and praise Thy Name, O most High.' The Epistle is Romans 6:3-11, St. Paul's explanation of the role of death and resurrection in baptism. This is the standard epistle read at baptisms.

Unique to this day, the Alleluia is replaced with Psalm 81 (82) being sung: "Arise, O God, judge Thou the earth: for Thou shalt have an inheritance in all the nations" while the deacon performs a censing of the church. Furthermore, in Slavic tradition where the service is begun in dark vestments, the hangings, altar cloths, curtain and vestments are changed to bright; in Greek and Arabic tradition, the clergy strew laurel leaves (a symbol of victory) and flower petals all over the church to symbolize Jesus' triumph over death, often accompanied – especially in Cypriot custom – by the congregation making a loud noise by stamping their feet, banging on pews and sticks, and even clanging pots and pans, all to symbolize Christ shattering the gates and breaking the chains of hell. While the liturgical atmosphere changes from sorrow to joy at this service, the faithful continue to fast and the Paschal greeting, "Christ is risen!", is not exchanged until after midnight during the Paschal Vigil since this service represents the proclamation of Jesus' victory over death to those in Hades, but the Resurrection has not yet been announced to those on earth which takes place during the Paschal Vigil.

The Gospel reading is Matthew 28:1-20, St. Matthew's account of the Resurrection. While the first fifteen verses are not read at any other time, the final five verses form one of the Sunday Matins Gospels and are the standard Gospel reading for baptisms.

The Cherubic Hymn is replaced by 'Let all mortal flesh keep silence', an analogous hymn from the ancient Liturgy of Saint James, and the Hymn to the Theotokos is replaced with the irmos from Ode 9 of the Canon the night before, Christ's promise to His Mother that she will be magnified following His Resurrection, but other than that the Liturgy proceeds as any other Liturgy of St. Basil. After the service, in many places, it is customary to break and bless bread as at a Vigil, but to omit the blessing of oil.

Great Lent was originally the period of catechesis for new converts in order to prepare them for baptism and chrismation and when there are converts received, that occurs during the Old testament readings during the vesperal divine liturgy. Before the midnight service, the faithful gather in church for the reading of the Acts of the Apostles in its entirety. Preceding midnight the Paschal Vigil begins with the Midnight Office, during which the Canon of Holy Saturday is repeated, toward the end of which the epitaphios is removed from the center of the church and placed on the altar table where it remains until the Ascension. Then, all of the candles and lights in the church are extinguished, and all wait in darkness and silence for the proclamation of the Resurrection of Christ.

Western traditions

In the Catholic Church, the altar remains stripped completely bare (following the Mass on Maundy Thursday). The celebration of the Sacraments is extremely limited: Holy Communion is given only as Viaticum to the dying; while Penance, Anointing of the Sick and baptism may be administered because they, like Viaticum, are helpful to ensuring salvation for the dying. The day is the second day of the Paschal fast as outlined in Sacrosanctum Concilium, Article 110.

Many Lutheran, Anglican, Methodist, and other Churches observe many of the same customs as the Catholic Church; however, their altars may be covered in black instead of being stripped. The Anglican Book of Common Prayer uses Easter Even to designate the day. In some Anglican churches, including the Protestant Episcopal Church in the United States of America, provision is made for a simple Liturgy of the Word on this day, with readings commemorating the burial of Christ. Daily Offices are still observed. In the Moravian Church, the day is known as Great Sabbath.

In the Catholic, Lutheran, Anglican and Methodist traditions, Holy Saturday lasts until nightfall, after which the Easter Vigil is celebrated, marking the official start of the Easter season.

In the Moravian Church, people decorate the graves in God's Acre with flowers; the sunrise service, the first liturgy of Paschaltide, begins before dawn of Easter Sunday.

Black Saturday
In the predominantly Catholic Philippines, the day is legally and colloquially known as Black Saturday, given the colour's role in mourning. It is the last day of fasting for Catholics in the Philippines. It commemorates the day that Jesus lay in his tomb. Traditional taboos from the previous day are carried over and are sometimes broken; swimming is allowed in the afternoon. Most commercial establishments resume operations, with smaller enterprises remaining closed until Easter. Television and radio stations broadcast on shorter hours with special programming or remain off-air.

In predominantly Catholic Poland, Święconka, meaning "the blessing of the Easter baskets", on Holy Saturday, is one of the most enduring and beloved traditions. Baskets containing eggs, ham, bread, sweet breads, horseradish, and lamb cakes or butter lambs are brought to church to be blessed.

Notes

References

Sources

External links
 Great and Holy Saturday, commentary by Protopresbyter Alexander Schmemann

Saturday observances
Holy Week
Christian terminology
Greek traditions
Public holidays in Greece
March observances
April observances
May observances
Eastern Orthodox liturgical days
Public holidays in Australia
Public holidays in El Salvador
Public holidays in Fiji
Public holidays in Honduras
Public holidays in India
Public holidays in the Philippines
Public holidays in Zambia
Public holidays in Zimbabwe
Holy Week processions
Harrowing of Hell